Moe Amery (né Amiri; September 20, 1954) is a former member of the Legislative Assembly of Alberta, who represented the constituency of Calgary-East as a Progressive Conservative.

Early life

Amery was born Moe Amiri (he changed his name sometime between 1989 and 1993) in Lebanon on September 20, 1954, and came to Canada in 1974.  He studied at the University of Alberta from 1975 until 1977, after which time he relocated to Calgary to become a realtor until his election to the Legislative Assembly of Alberta in 1993.

Provincial Politics

Electoral record

Amery's first two bids for elected office were unsuccessful; he sought provincial election in Calgary-Forest Lawn in the 1986 and 1989 elections, but was defeated both times, finishing second to New Democrat Barry Pashak each time.  He was more successful in 1993, when he more than doubled Pashak's vote count in the newly formed Calgary-East.  He was handily re-elected in each of the 1997, 2001, 2004, and 2008 elections.

Legislative initiatives

In 1994, Amery introduced two different bills called the Maintenance Enforcement Amendment Act.  The first, a private member's bill, would have made it impossible for individuals in arrears on child support payments to register their vehicles or renew their drivers' licenses.  The second, a government bill, included the objectives of the first, but also took other measures, including ending a provision by which money held in a joint bank account could not be drawn upon to satisfy child support payments owed by one of the account-holders.  The government bill passed with the support of the Progressive Conservatives and some Liberals, including Sine Chadi and Michael Henry.  Other Liberals - including Gary Dickson, Debby Carlson, Bettie Hewes, Mike Percy, Percy Wickman, Ken Nicol, Nicholas Taylor, and Colleen Soetaert - opposed the bill on the grounds that it didn't go far enough in taking measures to recover payments, promoted animosity in an already adversarial process, and was written with insufficient consultation with the recently privatized registries centres.  After the government bill passed, the private member's bill was ruled redundant by Speaker Stanley Schumacher.

Amery has introduced a number of private member's bills designed to extend primary education to include kindergarten, requiring school boards to provide it and making attendance compulsory.  The first two of these - both called the School Amendment Act, sponsored in 1995 and 1997 - failed to reach second reading before the legislature adjourned.  Amery's third attempt, the School (Early Childhood Services) Amendment Act, was defeated on second reading.  Liberals were unanimous in their support of the bill, pointing to similar bills that had previously been sponsored by Liberal MLAs Grant Mitchell and Michael Henry.  Several of Amery's Progressive Conservative Colleagues, including Mary O'Neill, Albert Klapstein, and Wayne Cao, also lent their support.  However, the bill was defeated on second reading with a majority of the P.C. caucus voting against.  Victor Doerksen, the only Conservative to speak in opposition to the bill, expressed concern that instituting mandatory attendance at the kindergarten level constituted an infringement on parental autonomy.  New Democrat Raj Pannu, the only member of his caucus present for the vote, also opposed the bill, on the grounds that it would allow private groups to provide kindergarten with the approval of the Minister of Learning.

In 1996, Amery sponsored the Wildlife Amendment Act,  a government bill that created a scientific committee to make recommendations on the designation of endangered and threatened species, expanded fish and wildlife agents' abilities to check for infractions of firearms regulations by hunters, and downloaded several government powers that had previously resided with the Lieutenant Governor by Order in Council to the Minister of Environmental Protection.  Some Liberals, including Duco Van Binsbergen and Bruce Collingwood, raised concerns that the bill didn't go far enough, but it was passed into law.

Committee duties

Amery has sat on numerous committees since being elected. In addition to his regular responsibilities as an MLA, he has served as chair of the Environmental Protection Advisory Committee and co-chair of the Secondary Suites Committee as well as a member of the Standing Committee on Privileges and Elections, Standing Orders and Printing, the Standing Committee on Private Bills, the Standing Committee on Public Accounts, the Standing Committee on the Alberta Heritage Savings Trust Fund, the Standing Committee on Government Services, the Standing Policy Committee on Agriculture, Environment and Rural Affairs, the Standing Policy Committee on Energy and Sustainable Development, and the Cabinet Policy Committee on Community Services in addition to serving as a member of the International Governance Office Advisory Committee, the Glenbow-Museum Advisory Committee, the MLA Committee To Review Low-income Programs, and the MLA Implementation Team on the Future Selection of RHA Members.  He was also the MLA representative on the City of Calgary's 2005 World Fair bid. Currently, Amery serves as a member of the Standing Committee on the Economy, the Standing Committee on Private Bills, and the Standing Committee on Privileges and Elections, Standing Orders and Printing.

Political views

Amery has broken with his party on several occasions regarding issues that mattered to his constituents. In March 2006 he was critical of the Ralph Klein government for insufficiently funding school maintenance after the roof of a school in his riding collapsed. In 2007 and during the 2008 election campaign, he advocated rent controls to deal with the tight housing market in urban Alberta, although the position of the Ed Stelmach government was that they would be unhelpful.

Passport incident
In 2002, the Royal Canadian Mounted Police began investigating whether Amery acted as guarantor for the passport application of a constituent who he had not known for the required two years.  He was charged with doing so in 2004.  The case went to trial in March 2005, when Amery alleged that, by telling him not to use character references from his colleagues, P.C. whip Denis Ducharme undermined "Amery's ability to make full answer and defence".  The charges were ultimately stayed.

Federal politics
In December 2017, Amery announced that he would challenge sitting Conservative MP Deepak Obhrai for the nomination in Calgary Forest Lawn.

Personal life

Amery is married to Mary, and the couple has five children: Mickey, Lila, Leena, Laura, and Malaak. Mickey was elected as the Member of the Alberta Legislature in the 2019 election in the riding of Calgary-Cross. He has been involved in his community, including the community associations in Calgary-East. He identifies Winston Churchill as his political hero.

Election results

References

1954 births
Businesspeople from Calgary
Canadian real estate agents
Lebanese emigrants to Canada
Living people
Politicians from Calgary
Progressive Conservative Association of Alberta MLAs
Canadian politicians of Lebanese descent
21st-century Canadian politicians
Place of birth missing (living people)